Sarfannguit Island is an island in the Qeqqata municipality in western Greenland.

Geography 
The island is of elongated shape, separated from the mainland of Greenland by Sarfannguit Channel, a narrow waterway at the eastern promontory occupied by the Sarfannguit settlement. The channel is unusual in that it connects the head of the narrower Amerloq Fjord bounding the island from the north to the larger Ikertooq Fjord in the southeast.

Several smaller islands trail Sarfannguit Island in the west, on the coastline of Davis Strait, of which Maniitsorsuaq and Uummannaarsussuaq are the largest, while tiny Nipisat Island is host to ruins from the early settlement. The island is hilly, with the highest point reaching . In the past, the coastal region was dotted with several small villages, all of which are now abandoned.

References 

Davis Strait
Islands of Greenland